H-Street Skateboards is a skateboard company started by Tony Magnusson and Mike Ternasky in 1987. H-Street garnered popularity through their innovative videos and skating .

History 
Magnusson and Ternasky went to George Hamad to pitch the idea for H-Street. Hamad liked the idea and funded the launch and oversaw the production of H-Street. H-Street was named after a street in Chula Vista, California, where several of the original team riders lived, in the "H-Street House".

In 1991, Ternasky left H-Street to start Plan B Skateboards with World Industries, taking several riders with him. In 1993, Magnusson also left H-Street.

After years of discussion, Magnusson and George Hamad resurrected the H-Street brand in 2008.

Riders 
Past and present:
Matt Hensley, Danny Way, Brian Lotti , John Schultes, Sal Barbier, Eddie Elguera, Darin “Cookiehead” Jenkins, Art Godoy, Ron Allen, Magnusson, Steve Ortega, Steve Godoy.

References

External links 

 H-STREET SKATEBOARDING - tumblr

Skateboarding companies